Katherine Escobar is a Colombian model and actress best known as Olivia on the Mafia Dolls telenovela, also work in novels such as New rich, new poor and I want to die like Catherine.

Filmography

References

l

Living people
Colombian female models
Colombian actresses
Colombian telenovela actresses
People from Pereira, Colombia
1982 births